Erling Kroken (born 12 November 1928) is a Norwegian ski jumper who competed in the early 1950s. He won the first Four Hills Tournament event at Oberstdorf in 1953.

References

1928 births
Living people
Norwegian male ski jumpers
Place of birth missing (living people)